State of Washington was a sternwheel steamboat of the Puget Sound Mosquito Fleet, later transferred to the Columbia River.

Career
State of Washington was built in 1889 by John J. Holland in Tacoma, Washington.  From 1889 to 1902 the vessel was placed on the Seattle-Bellingham route.  From 1902 to 1907, the vessel was operated as a standby boat on the Tacoma-Seattle run.  Later, the vessel was assigned to the Hood Canal route.  In 1913, the vessel was transferred to the Columbia River to be operated by the Shaver Transportation Company.  In 1915 the vessel was converted to a towboat. In 1921, the vessel was destroyed by a boiler explosion.  Six crewmen were injured and one man was killed.

References
 Affleck, Edwin L, ed. A Century of Paddlewheelers in the Pacific Northwest, the Yukon, and Alaska, Alexander Nicholls Press, Vancouver, BC (2000) 
 Findlay, Jean Cammon and Paterson, Robin, Mosquito Fleet of Southern Puget Sound, (2008) Arcadia Publishing 

1889 ships
Steamboats of Washington (state)
Steamboats of Oregon
Passenger ships of the United States
Sternwheelers of Washington (state)
Puget Sound Navigation Company
Shaver Transportation Company